W. Wesley McDonald (June 11, 1946 – September 9, 2014) was a professor of political science at Elizabethtown College.

Career 
His most recent and notable work is Russell Kirk and the Age of Ideology, published in 2004.  The book explores the political and philosophical ideas of the conservative intellectual (and friend and mentor of McDonald) Russell Kirk and his impact on conservatism in the 1940s and 50s.  McDonald has also written several articles on Kirk and 20th-century conservatism.

Degrees 
 1982 Ph.D, Catholic University of America
 1969 M.A., Bowling Green State University
 1968 B.A., Towson State University

Selected works 
 Russell Kirk and the Age of Ideology, University of Missouri Press 2004

References

External links 
 Elizabethtown College homepage
 

American political scientists
Towson University alumni
Catholic University of America alumni
Bowling Green State University alumni
1946 births
2014 deaths